Berkeley Hotel may refer to:

The Berkeley in London
Maison Alcan in Montreal